The 1999 Big Ten softball tournament was held at Alumni Field on the campus of the University of Michigan in Ann Arbor, Michigan.  As the tournament winner, Minnesota earned the Big Ten Conference's automatic bid to the 1998 NCAA Division I softball tournament. This was the first Big Ten softball tournament championship for Minnesota.

Format and seeding
The 1999 tournament was a five team double-elimination tournament except for the play-in game between 4th-seeded Michigan State and 5th-seeded Iowa. The top five teams based on conference regular season winning percentage earned invitations to the tournament.

Tournament

References

Big Ten softball tournament
Tournament
Big Ten softball tournament